The Daniel Thompson and John Ryle Houses are located in Paterson, Passaic County, New Jersey, United States. The houses were built in 1830 and were added to the National Register of Historic Places on July 30, 1981.

See also
National Register of Historic Places listings in Passaic County, New Jersey

References

Buildings and structures in Paterson, New Jersey
Federal architecture in New Jersey
Houses on the National Register of Historic Places in New Jersey
Houses completed in 1830
Houses in Passaic County, New Jersey
National Register of Historic Places in Passaic County, New Jersey
1830 establishments in New Jersey
New Jersey Register of Historic Places